The 1926 South Dakota gubernatorial election was held on November 2, 1926.  Incumbent Republican Governor Carl Gunderson ran for re-election to a second term. The election was largely a rematch of the 1924 election, with Gunderson's chief opponent from two years prior, Democrat William J. Bulow, challenging him once again. Two other candidates—Farmer–Labor nominee Tom Ayres and Pierre Mayor John E. Hipple, an independent—also ran. Though the left-leaning vote was split, Bulow was still able to win a decisive victory over Gunderson, whose support from two years earlier had completely collapsed.

Democratic Primary

Candidates
 William J. Bulow, former State Senator, former Union County Judge, former Mayor of Beresford, 1924 Democratic nominee for Governor
 Richard O. Richards, perennial candidate

Results

Republican Primary

Candidates
 Carl Gunderson, incumbent Governor
 C. E. Coyne, Secretary of State

Campaign
In the Republican primary, Gunderson faced a stiff challenge from Secretary of State C. E. Coyne, who lambasted the Gunderson administration for overspending, backtracking on his promises, creating a spoils system with his appointments, and committing "[f]requent blunders." Coyne's most prominent line of attack against Gunderson, however, was against the Governor's controversial reorganization of state government, which Coyne argued was a subterfuge for greed and corruption. Gunderson ultimately defeated Coyne by a decisive margin, but the difficulty he faced against Coyne presaged his weak position with the Republican base in the state.

Results

General election

Campaign
As the general election began, Gunderson started in a strong position, with some of the Republican newspapers in the state praising his primary victory as an "emphatic endorsement." The Lead Daily Call argued that "the voters have faith in this man of principle and honor" and "are eager to have him continue the work he has started at Pierre." The Rapid City Journal struck a similar tone, concluding that "Governor Gunderson should find great satisfaction in his vote. While he also had opposition, . . . the lack of attention paid the rival by the voters is assurance to the governor that the people want him to have a free swing at carrying out the reorganization plans which he has started." Further, the candidacy of John Hipple was seen as a blow to Bulow's chances. The Lead Daily Call predicted that Hipple was "promised several towns and several counties," splitting the anti-Gunderson vote in the general election.

But in the final weeks of the campaign, Gunderson seemed to lose ground. The South Dakota Farmers Union endorsed Bulow over Gunderson, even as it endorsed Republican Senator Peter Norbeck for re-election. An anti-Gunderson groundswell was apparently building with regular Republican voters, causing alarm in the Gunderson campaign, though it was unclear whether enough Republicans would defect to elect Bulow.

Ultimately, Bulow defeated Gunderson by a decisive margin, though he fell several points short of a majority victory. He became the state's first Democratic-affiliated candidate to win a gubernatorial election since Andrew E. Lee in 1898, and the first Democrat to serve as Governor. Even as Bulow won, however, the Republican Party's other nominees for statewide office won, and the legislature remained "overwhelmingly [R]epublican." Accordingly, despite Gunderson's loss, the Chairman of the Republican Party of South Dakota argued that "South Dakota [R]epublicans have every reason to rejoice over the election notwithstanding the fact that our candidate for the governorship was defeated." He added, "I feel it is a matter for congratulations that we have fared well."

Results

References

South Dakota
1926
Gubernatorial
November 1926 events